Remigius ( or ;  – 13 January 533) was the Bishop of Reims and "Apostle of the Franks". On 25 December 496, he baptised Clovis I, King of the Franks. The baptism, leading to about 3000 additional converts, was an important event in the Christianization of the Franks. Because of Clovis's efforts, a large number of churches were established in the formerly pagan lands of the Frankish empire, establishing a distinct Catholic variety of Christianity for the first time in Germanic lands, most of whom had been converted to Arian Christianity.

Life
Remigius was born, traditionally, at Cerny-en-Laonnois, near Laon, Picardy, into the highest levels of Gallo-Roman society. He is said to have been son of Emilius, count of Laon (who is not otherwise attested) and of Celina, daughter of the Bishop of Soissons, which Clovis had conquered in 487. He studied at Reims and soon became so noted for his learning and sanctity, and his high status, that he was elected Bishop of Reims at age 21, though still a layman.  He was both Lord Chancellor of France and Référendaire of France.

The story of the return of the sacred vessels (most notably the Vase of Soissons), which had been stolen from the church of Soissons, testifies to the friendly relations existing between him and Clovis, King of the Franks, whom he converted to Christianity with the assistance of Vedast (Vedastus, Vaast, Waast) and Clotilde, the Burgundian princess who was wife to Clovis. Even before he embraced Christianity, Clovis had showered benefits upon Remigius and the Christians of Reims, and after his victory over the Alamanni in the battle of Tolbiac at around 497 AD, he requested Remigius to baptize him at Reims (December 25, 496) in the presence of a large company of Franks and Alamanni; according to Gregory of Tours, 3,000 Franks were baptized with Clovis.

King Clovis granted Remigius stretches of territory, in which Remigius established and endowed many churches. He erected bishoprics at Tournai; Cambrai; Thérouanne, where he personally ordained the first bishop in 499; Arras, where he installed St. Vedast; and Laon, which he gave to his niece's husband Gunband. In 530 he consecrated Medardus, Bishop of Noyon. Remigius' brother Principius was Bishop of Soissons and also corresponded with Sidonius Apollinaris, whose letters give a sense of the highly cultivated courtly literary Gallo-Roman style all three men shared. 
  
The chroniclers of "Gallia Christiana" record that numerous donations were made to Remigius by the Frankish nobles, which he presented to the cathedral at Reims.

Though Remigius never attended any of the church councils, in 517 he held a synod at Reims, at which after a heated discussion he converted a bishop of Arian views. Although Remigius's influence over people and prelates was extraordinary, upon one occasion his condoning of the offences of one Claudius, a priest whom Remigius had consecrated, brought upon him the rebukes of his episcopal brethren, who deemed Claudius deserving of degradation. The reply of Remigius, still extant, is able and convincing.

Few authentic works of Remigius remain: his "Declamations" were elaborately admired by Sidonius Apollinaris, in a finely turned letter to Remigius, but are now lost. Four letters survive in the collection known as the Epistulae Austrasicae: one containing his defence in the matter of Claudius, two written to Clovis, and a fourth to Bishop Falco of Tongres. The "Testament of Saint Remigius" is apocryphal. A brief and strictly legendary "Vita" was formerly ascribed to Venantius Fortunatus. Another, according to Jacobus de Voragine, was written by Ignatius, bishop of Reims. A letter congratulating Pope Hormisdas upon his election (523) is apocryphal, and "the letter in which Pope Hormisdas appears to have appointed him vicar of the kingdom of Clovis is proved to be spurious; it is presumed to have been an attempt of Hincmar to base his pretensions for the elevation of Reims to the primacy, following the alleged precedent of Remigius."

A Commentary on the Pauline Epistles (edited Villalpandus, 1699) is not his work, but that of Remigius of Auxerre.

Remigius' relics were kept in the Cathedral of Reims, whence Hincmar had them translated to Épernay during the Viking invasions and thence, in 1099 to the Abbey of Saint-Rémy.

His tomb in Reims was deliberately desecrated on 7 October 1793 by a Commissioner of the Convention during the French Revolution due to the link between the tomb and royal patronage.

Christian Recognition 

His feast day in France is celebrated on 1 October.

Remigius is honored in the Church of England and in the Episcopal Church on 1 October.

Legacy
List of churches dedicated to Saint Remigius:
 Saint Remigius Church - a Roman Catholic church in Simpelveld, Netherlands 
 Long Clawson - an Anglican church in the village of Long Clawson, Leicestershire 
 Stoke Holy Cross - an Anglican church in the village of Stoke Holy Cross in South Norfolk
 Seething Norfolk. Church of England round tower church dedicated to St Margaret and St Remigius
 Saint Remigius Church, a Roman Catholic church in Haacht, Belgium
 Saint Remigius Church of England in the village of Hethersett, Norfolk, England.

See also

 List of Catholic saints
 Vase of Soissons
 Saint Abran, hermit of Brittany
 Frankish Chancellors.

References

Further reading
Jacobus de Voragine, The Golden Legend, October 1: "St. Remigius."

External links

The Life of St. Remigius, Bishop of Reims and Apostle of the Franks
Philip Schaff, "The New Schaff-Herzog Encyclopedia of Religious Knowledge," entry by A. Hauck
Of the life of St. Remigius
Colonnade Statue St Peter's Square

437 births
533 deaths
6th-century Frankish bishops
6th-century Frankish saints
6th-century Frankish writers
6th-century Latin writers
Bishops of Reims
Burials at the Royal Abbey of Saint-Remi
Gallo-Roman saints
Latin letter writers
Medieval chancellors (government)
Patron saints of France
Anglican saints